Giant Pictures is an American film distribution company founded by Nick Savva and Jeff Stabenau with offices in New York City and Los Angeles. The company releases feature films, documentaries and series on streaming platforms, with an emphasis on flexibility and customization for filmmakers. Since 2022 the company has owned and operated the Drafthouse Films label.

History 
Founded in New York City in 2017 by Nick Savva, who had previously worked in digital distribution for the Tribeca Festival, the company was initially launched under the name Streaming Plus. Its first film release was Newness directed by Drake Doremus, which the company had acquired following its world premiere at the 2017 Sundance Film Festival.

Initially a subsidiary of Giant Interactive, a technology services company owned by post production entrepreneur, Jeff Stabenau, Giant Pictures focused on distribution to streaming platforms including AppleTV, Vudu, Prime Video, Netflix, Tubi, The Roku Channel, Pluto TV and Peacock. In 2020, in order to expand its global digital distribution efforts, Giant Pictures split from Giant Interactive, although the companies maintained a close relationship as technology partners.

In August 2021 Giant Pictures partnered with the Tribeca Festival to create The Tribeca Channel, a free, ad-supported movie streaming channel in the US and Canada. Subsequently the company built various apps and channels on platforms such as The Roku Channel, XUMO, LG, Vizio and Plex. By 2022, Giant Pictures was releasing upwards of 40 new feature films annually and had more than 1,000 titles under management via content partnerships with numerous independent studios.

In February 2023, it was reported by Deadline.com that Giant Pictures had acquired US theatrical and VOD rights to A House Made Of Splinters, one of the 2023 Oscar nominees for Best Documentary Feature. Subsequently Giant released the film on digital platforms including Apple TV and Prime Video. A theatrical release was announced at select Alamo Drafthouse theaters beginning in March 2023.

Drafthouse Films 
Following a collaboration on the re-release of the cult 1980’s genre movie Action USA, in early 2021 Giant Pictures signed a sales representation deal with Austin, TX-based distribution label, Drafthouse Films, for the acclaimed films in its catalog. Subsequently the Drafthouse titles were made available on multiple streaming platforms including Tubi, Kanopy, Shudder and Hulu. In March 2022, Giant Pictures acquired Drafthouse Films with Nick Savva serving as Drafthouse Films’ new CEO and Alamo Drafthouse founder Tim League becoming chairman.

The first two films to be released by the newly acquired company were Nr. 10, directed by Alex Van Warmerdam and Masking Threshold, directed by Johannes Grenzfurthner. Both films had a close association with Alamo Drafthouse Cinemas and its related media companies, having premiered at Fantastic Fest then playing at Alamo Drafthouse locations, followed by streaming releases on the Alamo On Demand platform and through Giant Pictures.

Content

Select filmography

Studio partners 

 Abramorama
 Cyber Group Studios
 Indican Pictures
 Magic Light Pictures
 Participant
 Passion River Films
 Topic Studios
 Transition Studios
 Tribeca Enterprises
 Uncommon Productions
 Yellow Veil Pictures

Streaming channels 

 Tribeca Channel
 Kino Cult
 Baby Einstein

References

External links 

 Official website
 Giant Pictures at IMDB

Film distributors of the United States
American independent film studios
American companies established in 2017
Mass media companies based in New York City